The 1938–39 British Ice Hockey season featured the English National League and Scottish National League.

English National League

London Cup

Results

Scottish National League

Points Competition
Scores

Table

Regular season
Scores

(*Matches awarded to the Dundee Tigers as the Perth Panthers used an illegal player.)

Table

Mitchell Trophy

Results

President's Pucks

Results

Simpson Trophy

Results
Scores
Dundee Tigers - Perth Panthers 7:4 on aggregate (4:3, 3:1) 
Dundee Tigers - Falkirk Lions 11:9 on aggregate (8:5, 3:4) 
Fife Flyers - Glasgow Select 13:4 on aggregate (7:0, 6:4) 
Falkirk Lions - Glasgow Select 13:4 on aggregate (7:2, 6:2) 
Dundee Tigers - Glasgow Select 10:5 on aggregate (4:4, 6:1)
Perth Panthers - Glasgow Select 9:4 on aggregate (5:1, 4:3)
Perth Panthers - Falkirk Lions 12:8 on aggregate (3:2, 9:6)
Fife Flyers - Falkirk Lions 11:9 on aggregate (3:4, 8:5)
Fife Flyers - Perth Panthers (3:4, 5:7) - Panthers were forced to forfeit after playing Earl Nicholson, a player signed from the Harringay Racers, without the permission of the SIHA 
Fife Flyers - Dundee Tigers 7:6 on aggregate (5:3, 2:3)
Standings

Coronation Cup

Results
First round
Perth Panthers 3 - Kelvingrove 2 
Glasgow Mohawks 2 - Glasgow Lions 0
Semifinals
Perth Panthers 2 - Glasgow Mohawks 1
Perth Black Hawks 3 - Glasgow Mustangs 2
Final
Perth Panthers 3 - Perth Black Hawks 2

References 

British